Jamon Lloyd Dumas-Johnson is an American football linebacker for the Georgia Bulldogs.

College career
Dumas-Johnson attended Saint Frances Academy in Baltimore, Maryland. He committed to the University of Georgia to play college football.

As a true freshman at Georgia in 2021, Dumas-Johnson played in 14 games as a backup recording 22 tackles, two sacks and one interception he returned for a touchdown. He took over as a starter his sophomore year in 2022.

References

External links
Georgia Bulldogs bio

Living people
Players of American football from Maryland
American football linebackers
Georgia Bulldogs football players
Year of birth missing (living people)